Cross-cultural may refer to
cross-cultural studies, a comparative tendency in various fields of cultural analysis 
cross-cultural communication, a field of study that looks at how people from differing cultural backgrounds communicate
any of various forms of interactivity between members of disparate cultural groups (see also cross-cultural communication, interculturalism, intercultural relations, hybridity, cosmopolitanism, transculturation)
the discourse concerning cultural interactivity, sometimes referred to as cross-culturalism (See also multiculturalism, cosmopolitanism, transculturation, cultural diversity)

Cross-cultural communication 

By the 1970s, the field of cross-cultural communication (also known as intercultural communication) developed as a prominent application of the cross-cultural paradigm, in response to the pressures of globalization which produced a demand for cross-cultural awareness training in various commercial sectors.

Cultural communication differences can be identified by 8 different criteria: 
 when to talk; 
 what to say; 
 pacing and pausing; 
 the art of listening; 
 intonation; 
 what is conventional and what is not in a language; 
 degree of indirectness; and 
 cohesion and coherence.

Cross-cultural pedagogies 

The appearance of the term "cross-cultural" in the titles of a number of college readers and writing textbooks beginning in the late 1980s can be attributed to a convergence of academic multiculturalism and the pedagogical movement known as Writing Across the Curriculum, which gave educators in the social sciences greater influence in composition pedagogy. Popular examples included Ourselves Among Others: Cross-Cultural Readings for Writers (1988), edited by Carol J. Verburg, and Guidelines: A Cross Cultural Reading Writing Text (1990), ed. Ruth Spack.

Cross-cultural studies

Cross-cultural studies is an adaptation of the term cross-cultural to describe a branch of literary and cultural studies dealing with works or writers associated with more than one culture.  Practitioners of cross-cultural studies often use the term cross-culturalism to describe discourses involving cultural interactivity, or to promote (or disparage) various forms of cultural interactivity.

Cross-culturalism is nearly synonymous with transculturation, a term coined by Cuban writer  Fernando Ortiz in the 1940s to describe processes of cultural hybridity in Latin America.  However, there are certain differences of emphasis reflecting the social science derivation of cross-culturalism.

The term "cross-culturalism" became prevalent in cultural studies in the late 1980s and 1990s.  An early proponent of the term was the Guyanese writer Wilson Harris, who wrote in The Womb of Space (1983), that "cultural heterogeneity or cross-cultural capacity" gives an "evolutionary thrust" to the imagination.

Anthropology exerted a strong influence on the development of cross-culturalism in literary and cultural studies.  French anthropologist Claude Lévi-Strauss was a key figure in the development of structuralism and its successor, post-structuralism.  Cross-influences between anthropology and literary/cultural studies in the 1980s were evident in works such as James Clifford and George Marcus's collection, Writing Culture: the Poetics and Politics of Ethnography (1986).  Harvard anthropologist Clifford Geertz was cited as an influence on literary critics like Stephen Greenblatt, while other literary/cultural scholars turned to works by Victor Turner and Mary Douglas.

Like multiculturalism, cross-culturalism is sometimes construed as ideological, in that it advocates values such as those associated with transculturation, transnationalism, cosmopolitanism, interculturalism, and globalism.  Nevertheless, cross-culturalism is a fundamentally neutral term, in that favorable portrayal of other cultures or the processes of cultural mixing are not essential to the categorization of a work or writer as cross-cultural.

Cross-culturalism is distinct from multiculturalism.  Whereas multiculturalism deals with cultural diversity within a particular nation or social group, cross-culturalism is concerned with exchange beyond the boundaries of the nation or cultural group.

Cross-culturalism in literary and cultural studies is a useful rubric for works, writers and  artists that do not fit within a single cultural tradition.  To the extent that cultures are national, the cross-cultural may be considered as overlapping the transnational.  The cross-cultural can also be said to incorporate the colonial and the postcolonial, since colonialism is by definition a form of cross-culturalism.  Travel literature also makes up a substantial component of cross-cultural literature.  Of the various terms, "cross-culturalism" is the most inclusive, since it is free of transnationalism's dependence on the nation-state and colonialism/postcolonialism's restriction to colonized or formerly-colonized regions.  This inclusiveness leads to certain definitional ambiguity (albeit one derived from the term culture itself).  In practice, "cross-cultural" is usually applied only to situations involving significant cultural divergence.  Thus, the term is not usually applied in cases involving crossing between European nations, or between Europe and the United States.  However, there is no clear reason why, for example, Alexis de Tocqueville's Democracy in America or even Woody Allen's Annie Hall (in which the protagonist experiences culture shock after traveling to Los Angeles from New York City) could not be considered cross-cultural works.

Although disagreement over what constitutes a "significant" cultural divergence creates difficulties of categorization, "cross-cultural" is nevertheless useful in identifying writers, artists, works, etc., who may otherwise tend to fall between the cracks of various national cultures.

Cross-cultural studies in the social sciences 

The term "cross-cultural" emerged in the social sciences in the 1930s, largely as a result of the Cross-Cultural Survey undertaken by George Peter Murdock, a Yale anthropologist.  Initially referring to comparative studies based on statistical compilations of cultural data, the term gradually acquired a secondary sense of cultural interactivity.  The comparative sense is implied in phrases such as "a cross-cultural perspective," "cross-cultural differences," "a cross-cultural study of..." and so forth, while the interactive sense may be found in works like Attitudes and Adjustment in Cross-Cultural Contact: Recent Studies of Foreign Students, a 1956 issue of The Journal of Social Issues.  

Usage of "cross-cultural" was for many decades restricted mainly to the social sciences.  Among the more prominent examples are the International Association for Cross-Cultural Psychology (IACCP), established in 1972 "to further the study of the role of cultural factors in shaping human behavior," and its associated Journal of Cross-Cultural Psychology, which aims to provide an interdisciplinary discussion of the effects of cultural differences.

Cross-cultural films

The African Queen
Anna and the King
Babel
Bride and Prejudice
Jodhaa Akbar
Mammoth
Merry Christmas, Mr. Lawrence
The King and I
The Last Samurai
The Man Who Would Be King
The Namesake
Outsourced
Princess Tam Tam

Cross-cultural theatre 

Note that in the early 21st century the term "intercultural theatre" is preferred to "cross-cultural theatre."

Companies 
International Centre for Theatre Research
The Bridge Stage of the Arts
TheatreWorks (Singapore)
Darpana Academy of Performing Arts

Plays and theatre pieces 
Homebody/Kabul by Tony Kushner 
Indian Ink by Tom Stoppard 
Madame Butterfly (1900) by David Belasco 
Miss Saigon
The Mahabharata by Peter Brook
The Mikado (1885), a comic opera in two acts by Gilbert and Sullivan
The Gondoliers (1889), a comic opera in two acts by Gilbert and Sullivan

Characteristics of cross-cultural narratives 

Cross-cultural narrative forms may be described in terms of common characteristics or tropes shared by cross-cultural writers, artists, etc.  Examples include primitivism, exoticism, as well as culturally specific forms such as Orientalism, Japonisme.

Cross-cultural narratives tend to incorporate elements such as:
acculturation or resistance to acculturation
culture shock
ethnographic description
overcoming of social obstacles through acculturation, tricksterism, kindness, luck, hard work, etc.
return home (often accompanied by further culture shock)
social obstacles such as discrimination, racism, prejudice, stereotypes, linguistic difficulties, linguicism 
travel writing

Cross-cultural music 

Music has long been a central medium for cross-cultural exchange.  The cross-cultural study of music is referred to as ethnomusicology.

Cross-cultural theatre directors
Peter Brook (United Kingdom)

Cross-cultural visual artists 
Leonard Tsuguharu Foujita (Japan, France)
Paul Gauguin (France, Tahiti)
Isamu Noguchi (United States, Japan, France, India)

Cross-cultural writers (autobiography, fiction, poetry) 

Meena Alexander (India, Sudan, England, United States)
Elvia Ardalani (Mexico, United States, Iran)
Ruth Benedict (United States, Dutch New Guinea, Japan)
Aimé Césaire (Martinique, France)
Joseph Conrad (Poland, England, Congo)
Charles Eastman (Sioux, United States)
Olaudah Equiano (Igbo, United States, England)
Lafcadio Hearn (Greece, Ireland, United States, Japan)
Joseph Heco (Japan, United States)
Rudyard Kipling (India, England, United States)
Jhumpa Lahiri (England, United States, India)
Anna Leonowens (India, England, Thailand, Canada)
Spike Milligan (India, England, Ireland)
Yone Noguchi (Japan, United States)
Marco Polo (Italy, China)
Victor Segalen (France, China)
Khal Torabully (France, Mauritius)

See also

References

External links
Cross-cultural experience narratives compiled by the Glimpse Foundation
Cross-Cultural Study: Some Considerations
 Transtext(e)sTranscultures trilingual (English, Chinese, French) journal of the Institute for Transtextual and Transcultural Studies, University of Lyon, France.
 Comparing Nigerians and Canadians: Insights from Social Survey Research, 1990-2005
 Modes and models for transcending cultural differences, Journal of Research in International Education, Van Hook, S.R. 2011 
 Zuckermann, Ghil'ad et al. (2015), ENGAGING - A Guide to Interacting Respectfully and Reciprocally with Aboriginal and Torres Strait Islander People, and their Arts Practices and Intellectual Property, Australian Government: Indigenous Culture Support.

Cultural concepts
Interculturalism